Gundi, New South Wales is  a bounded rural locality and  civil parish of Gowen County, in New South Wales.

Gundi is in the Warrumbungle Shire located at 31°17′54″S 149°11′04″E.  The Parish is adjacent to the town of Coonabarabran.

References

Localities in New South Wales
Geography of New South Wales
Central West (New South Wales)